Dennis Johnson (1954–2007) was an American basketball player.

Dennis or Denis Johnson may also refer to:
Denis Johnson (inventor) ( – 1833), British coachmaker and bicycle-maker
Dennis Johnson (politician) (born 1949), American politician
Denis Johnson (1949–2017), American author
Dennis Johnson (defensive tackle) (1951–1997), American football defensive lineman for the Washington Redskins and Buffalo Bills
Dennis Johnson (linebacker) (born 1958), former American football linebacker for the Minnesota Vikings and the Tampa Bay Buccaneers
Dennis Johnson (fullback) (born 1956), former American football fullback for the Buffalo Bills and New York Giants
Dennis Johnson (defensive end) (born 1979), former American football defensive end  for the Arizona Cardinals and San Francisco 49ers 
Dennis Johnson (running back) (born 1990), American football running back
Dennis Johnson (athlete) (1939–2021), Jamaican sprinter
Dennis Johnson (composer) (1938–2018), American mathematician and composer

See also
Denis Johnston (1901–1984), writer